Yan Wing-shean (Chinese: 鄭明祥, Pinyin: Zhèng Míng-xiáng; born 20 June 1966) is a Taiwanese fencer. He competed in the individual foil and sabre events at the 1988 Summer Olympics.

References

External links
 

1966 births
Living people
Taiwanese male foil fencers
Olympic fencers of Taiwan
Fencers at the 1988 Summer Olympics
Taiwanese male sabre fencers
20th-century Taiwanese people